Groaning Spinney is a 1950 mystery detective novel by the British writer Gladys Mitchell. It is the twenty third in her long-running series featuring the psychoanalyst and amateur detective Mrs Bradley. It was later republished under the title of Murder in the Snow.

Synopsis
While staying for Christmas with her nephew and his family at his house in Gloucestershire in the Cotswolds, Mrs Bradley is intrigued by a local legend about a murdered Victorian village parson whose ghost appears at the entrance to a copse of trees known as "Groaning Spinney". She is drawn to investigate when a corpse is found there in imitation of the death of a century earlier.

References

Bibliography
 Klein, Kathleen Gregory. Great Women Mystery Writers: Classic to Contemporary. Greenwood Press, 1994.
 Reilly, John M. Twentieth Century Crime & Mystery Writers. Springer, 2015.

1950 British novels
Novels by Gladys Mitchell
British crime novels
Novels set in London
Novels set in Gloucestershire
British detective novels
Michael Joseph books